Our Saviour's Cemetery (Danish: Vor Frelsers Kirkegård) is located at the corner of Amagerbrogade and Prags Boulevard in Copenhagen, Denmark.

History
Our Saviour's Church was originally surrounded by a graveyard.

The current Our Saviour's Cemetery was established in 1790 since the existing cemeteries in Christianshavn were no longer able to cope with the number of burials. In 1853, as a consequence of the 1853 Copenhagen Cholera Outbreak, all inner city burials were prohibited.

Design
The brick wall that surrounds the cemetery dates from 1927. A new administration building was inaugurated in 2011. The cemetery was refurbished in 2015. A cobbled area surrounded by benches was established in the centre of the cemetery where its two principal avenues cross each other.

Burials
 Ole Brask (1935–2009), photographer
 Edel Bærskog (1920–2015), painter
  (1935–1975), jazz musician
  (1880–1960), film actress,
 Jørgen Kiil, film actor
 Jesper Klein (1944–2001), actor and entertainer
 Henry Lohmann (1924–1967), actor
  (1946–2001), film actress
 Svend Pri (1946–1983), badminton player
 Henrik Sandberg (1919–1993), film producer
 Christian Wilhelm Schultz-Lorentzen
 Gunnar Strømvad (1908–1972), actor
  (1935–1992), poet, choreographer and musician
 Eva-Maria Wiehe (1919–2012), illustrator

References

External links
 Official website
 

Cemeteries in Copenhagen
1790 establishments in Denmark
Cemeteries established in the 1790s